The 2013 Hampden–Sydney Tigers football team represented Hampden–Sydney College in the 2013 NCAA Division III football season. It was the Tiger's 119th overall, the 38th as a member of the Old Dominion Athletic Conference. The team was led by Marty Favret, in his fourteenth year as head coach, and played its home games at Lewis C. Everett Stadium in Death Valley, Hampden–Sydney, Virginia. They finished the season 9–3, 6–1 in ODAC play to finish in first place in the conference. They received an automatic bid to the Division III Playoffs where they defeated Maryville  in the first round and lost to #2 Linfield in the second round.

Personnel

Coaching staff

Schedule

Ranking movements

References

Hampden–Sydney
Hampden–Sydney Tigers football seasons
Hampden–Sydney
Hampden–Sydney Tigers football